The 1988 France rugby union tour of South America was a series of eight matches played by the France national rugby union team in Argentina and Paraguay in June 1988. The French team won six matches, drew one and lost one. The two-match series against the Argentina national rugby union team was drawn, France winning the first game and Argentina the second, in front of a crowd of 50,000 spectators.

Match summary

Match details 
Legend
ALU= Alumni, BCR= Buenos Aires CRC, BN= Banco Nación, CAR=Atlético Rosario, CASI=C.A. San Isidro, CP=Pucará, CUBA=Universitario BA, CUY=Unión de Rugby de Cuyo, HC=Hindú, IRFU=Irish Rugby Football Union, JCR=Jockey Club Rosario, LP= La Plata RC, ORC=Olivos, SIC=San Isidro Club, SL=San Luis, SM=Club San Martín, UAR=Argentine Rugby Union, UCR= Unión Cordobesa de Rugby, URR= Unión de Rugby de Rosario, URT=Unión de Rugby de Tucumán 

San Isidro Club: C.Pirán; P.Chevalier Boutell, D.Cuesta Silva, M.Loffreda (capt.), A.Ramallo; R.Madero, A.Soares Gache; F.Conti, I.Cirio R.De Vedia; G.Gassó, R.Petti; D.Cash, J.J.Angelillo, L.Lonardi. France: S.Blanco; D.Camberabero, M.Andrieu, D.Charvet, P.Lagisquet; F.Mesnel, P.Berbizier (capt.); M.Cécillon, L.Rodríguez, E.Champ; J.Condom, A.Lorieux; P.Ondarts, P.Marocco, L.Armary.

 Tucumán: P.Imbert; G.Terán, J.Gianotti, S.Mesón, J.Soler; R.Sauze, P.Merlo; G.Palau, M.Picci (capt.), P.Garretón; P.Buabse, O.Fascioli; J.Coria, R.Le Fort, R.Horta (75' R.Prado).  France: J.B.Lafond; B.Lacombe, D.Charvet, P.Bérot, D.Camberabero; J.Trille, M.Hondagne (capt.) ; J.Gratton, C.Deslandes, A.Carminati; D.Erbani, P.Beraud; P.Ondarts, P.Marocco, JP Garuet-Lempirou 

 Buenos Aires: G.Angaut (LP); C.Wagner (HC), M.E.licagaray (CUBA), G.Maschwitz (CUBA), P.Lanza (CUBA); S.Salvat (ALU), A.Soares Gache (SIC), (capt.); F.Conti (SIC), J.Delguy (CP), J.Uriarte (CUBA); G.Travaglini (CASI), D.Silva (ORC); M.Urbano (BCR), A.Courreges (CASI), D.González (San Luis. France: S.Blanco; P.Lagisquet, P.Sella, M.Andrieu, P.Bérot; F.Mesnel, P.Berbizier (capt.) ; M.Cécillon, L.Rodriguez (58' D.Erbani), E.Champ; J.Condom, A.Lorieux; L.Armary, P.Din¬trans, JP Garuet-Lempirou (34'P.Ondarts)  

 Provincias Argentinas: G.Del Castillo (URR); J.Soler (URT), S.Mesón (URT), P.Garzón (UCR), (G.Terán (URT); G.Filizzola (CUY), P.Merlo (URT), (capt.); G.Suárez Lago (CUY), G.Maldonado (UCR), D.Tobal (UCR); O.Fascioli (URT), C.Montene¬gro (UCR); J.Coria (URT), R.Le Fort (URT), A.Centeno (UCR).  Francia : J-B Lafond (20' M.Andrieu); D.Camberabero, U.Charvet, F.Velo, P.Bérot; J.Trille, M.Hondagne; P.Athapignet, J.Graton; P.Beraud, D.Erbani; P.Ondarts, D.Dubroca (capt.), P.Marocco.

Argentina:: A.Scolni (ALU); G.Terán (URT), D.Cuesta Silva (SIC), M.Loffreda (SIC), C.Mendy (LT); F.Turnes (BN), D.Baetti (CAR); P.Garretón (URT), G.Milano (JCR), J.Allen (CASI), (capt.); A.Iachetti (HC), E.Branca (CASI); D.Cash (SIC), J.J.Angelillo (SIC) (D.González - San Luis), S.Dengra SM  France: S.Blanco; P.Bérot, P.Sella, M.Andrieu, P.Lagisquet; F.Mesnel, P.Berbizier (capt.) ; E.Champ, L..Rodríguez, A.Carminati.; J.Condom, A.Lorieux; JP Garuet-Lempirou, P.Din¬trans, P.Ondarts.

 Córdoba:  J.Tomalino; L.Muzi, P.Garzón, J.Caminotti (capt.) (70' E.Rodríguez), R.Capelli; D.Domínguez R.López Aragón; D.Tobal, G.Maldonado, G.Ruiz Montes de Oca; C.Montenegro, G.Bravo, A.Centeno, C.Hernández (65' G.Bernardi), J.Gigena.  France: J.Trille; B.Lacombe, F.Velo, D.Charvet, P.Lagisquet; D.Camberabero, NI.Hondagne, M.Cécillon, C.Deslandes (P.Arthapignet), J.Gratton; P.Beraud, D.Erbani; P.Marocco, C.Dubroca (capt.),L.Armary. 

 Argentina: A.Scolni (ALU); D.Cuesta Silva (SIC), M.Loffreda (SIC), F.Turnes (BN), C.Mendy (LT); R.Madero (S.I.C); D.Baetti (CAR); J.Allen (CASI) (capt.).G.Milano (JCR), P.Garretón (URT); A.Iachetti (HC), E.Branca (CASI); D.Cash (SIC), A.Courreges (CASI), S.Den¬gra SM Coach: R. O'Reilly  France: S.Blanco; P.Bérot, P.Sella, M.Andrieu, P.Lagisquet; F.Mesnel, P.Berbizier (70' M.Hondagne) (capt.); A.Carminati, L.Rodriguez, M.Cécillon; J.Condom, A.Lorieux ; JP Garuet-Lempirou, P.Dintrans, P.Ondarts Coach:J. Fouroux

Bibliography

References

France tour
Rugby union tours of Argentina
France national rugby union team tours
tour